Hans Gruber is the main antagonist in the 1988 film Die Hard.

Hans Gruber may also refer to:
Hans Gruber (conductor), a Canadian conductor
Hans Gruber (footballer), a German footballer
Dr. Hans Gruber, a character in the 1985 film Re-Animator
Hans Gruber, an antagonist in the 1966 film Our Man Flint
Hans Gruber, a pet pig in several episodes of the television series American Housewife
Hans Gruber, a character played by Heiko Ruprecht in the 2008 German-Austrian TV series Der Bergdoktor

See also
 Hans Grüper, former identity of Dr. Arthur Arden, a character in the TV series American Horror Story: Asylum